Evaristo Mazzón (born 4 April 1960) is a Uruguayan boxer. He competed in the men's light welterweight event at the 1984 Summer Olympics. At the 1984 Summer Olympics, he lost to Apelu Ioane of Samoa.

References

1960 births
Living people
Uruguayan male boxers
Olympic boxers of Uruguay
Boxers at the 1984 Summer Olympics
Place of birth missing (living people)
Light-welterweight boxers